The 1885 United Kingdom general election was held from 24 November to 18 December 1885. This was the first general election after an extension of the franchise and redistribution of seats. For the first time a majority of adult males could vote and most constituencies by law returned a single member to Parliament, fulfilling one of the ideals of Chartism to provide direct single-member, single-electorate accountability. It saw the Liberals, led by William Gladstone, win the most seats, but not an overall majority.  As the Irish Nationalists held the balance of power between them and the Conservatives who sat with an increasing number of allied Unionist MPs (referring to the Union of Great Britain and Ireland), this exacerbated divisions within the Liberals over Irish Home Rule and led to a Liberal split and another general election the following year.

The 1885 election saw the first socialist party participate, with the Social Democratic Federation led by H. M. Hyndman standing three candidates.

Results

|}

Voting summary

Seats summary

See also
List of MPs elected in the 1885 United Kingdom general election
Parliamentary franchise in the United Kingdom 1885–1918
Representation of the People Act 1884
Redistribution of Seats Act 1885
1885 United Kingdom general election in Ireland
1885 United Kingdom general election in Scotland
 Hawarden Kite, Gladstone announces for Home Rule and wins over the Irish

Notes

References

Further reading
 Roberts, Matthew. "Election Cartoons and Political Communication In Victorian England.' Cultural & Social History (2013) 10#3 pp 369–395, covers 1860 to 1890.

External links
 Spartacus: Political Parties and Election Results
 United Kingdom election results—summary results 1885–1979 

 
1885 elections in the United Kingdom
1885
General election
November 1885 events
December 1885 events